Jiagedaqi railway station is a railway station in Jiagedaqi District, Daxing'anling Prefecture. It is located on the Yitulihe–Jiagedaqi railway and Nenjiang–Greater Khingan Forest railway. It was founded in 1965.

References 

Railway stations in Heilongjiang
Railway stations in China opened in 1965